The Philadelphia Inquirer is a daily newspaper headquartered in Philadelphia, Pennsylvania. The newspaper's circulation is the largest in both the U.S. state of Pennsylvania and the Delaware Valley metropolitan region of Southeastern Pennsylvania, South Jersey, Delaware, and the northern Eastern Shore of Maryland, and the 17th largest in the United States as of 2017.  

Founded on June 1, 1829 as The Pennsylvania Inquirer, The Philadelphia Inquirer is the third-longest continuously operating daily newspaper in the nation. It has won 20 Pulitzer Prizes . 

The Inquirer first became a major newspaper during the American Civil War. The paper's circulation dropped after the Civil War's conclusion but then rose again by the end of the 19th century. Originally supportive of the Democratic Party, The Inquirers political orientation eventually shifted toward the Whig Party and then the Republican Party before officially becoming politically independent in the middle of the 20th century. By the end of the 1960s, The Inquirer trailed its chief competitor, The Philadelphia Evening Bulletin, and lacked modern facilities and experienced staff. In the 1970s, however, new owners and editors turned the newspaper into one of the country's most prominent.

The newspaper is owned by The Philadelphia Inquirer, LLC, which also publishes Philadelphia Daily News, the city's daily tabloid, and a news portal (philly.com). The newspaper's publisher and chief executive officer is Elizabeth H. Hughes, and its editor is Gabriel Escobar.

History

19th century

The Philadelphia Inquirer was founded June 1, 1829, by printer John R. Walker and John Norvell, former editor of Philadelphia's largest newspaper, the Aurora & Gazette. An editorial in the first issue of The Pennsylvania Inquirer promised that the paper would be devoted to the right of a minority to voice their opinion and "the maintenance of the rights and liberties of the people, equally against the abuses as the usurpation of power." They pledged support to then-President Andrew Jackson and "home industries, American manufactures, and internal improvements that so materially contribute to the agricultural, commercial and national prosperity." Founded on June 1, 1829, The Philadelphia Inquirer is the third-oldest surviving daily newspaper in the United States. However, in 1962, an Inquirer-commissioned historian traced The Inquirer to John Dunlap's The Pennsylvania Packet, which was founded on October 28, 1771. In 1850, The Packet was merged with another newspaper, The North American, which later merged with the Philadelphia Public Ledger. Finally, the Public Ledger merged with The Philadelphia Inquirer in the 1930s, and between 1962 and 1975, a line on The Inquirer'''s front page claimed that the newspaper is the United States' oldest surviving daily newspaper.

Six months after The Inquirer was founded, with competition from eight established daily newspapers, lack of funds forced Norvell and Walker to sell the newspaper to publisher and United States Gazette associate editor Jesper Harding. After Harding acquired The Pennsylvania Inquirer, it was briefly published as an afternoon paper before returning to its original morning format in January 1830. Under Harding, in 1829, The Inquirer moved from its original location between Front and Second Streets to between Second and Third Streets. When Harding bought and merged the Morning Journal in January 1830, the newspaper was moved to South Second Street. Ten years later The Inquirer again was moved, this time to its own building at the corner of Third Street and Carter's Alley. Harding expanded The Inquirers content and the paper soon grew into a major Philadelphian newspaper. The expanded content included the addition of fiction, and in 1840, Harding gained rights to publish several Charles Dickens novels for which Dickens was paid a significant amount. At the time the common practice was to pay little or nothing for the rights of foreign authors' works.

Harding retired in 1859 and was succeeded by his son William White Harding, who had become a partner three years earlier. William Harding changed the name of the newspaper to its current name, The Philadelphia Inquirer. Harding, in an attempt to increase circulation, cut the price of the paper, began delivery routes and had newsboys sell papers on the street. In 1859, circulation had been around 7,000; by 1863 it had increased to 70,000. Part of the increase was due to the interest in news during the American Civil War. Twenty-five to thirty thousand copies of The Inquirer were often distributed to Union soldiers during the war and several times the U.S. government asked The Philadelphia Inquirer to issue a special edition specifically for soldiers. The Philadelphia Inquirer supported the Union, but Harding wanted their coverage to remain neutral. Confederate generals often sought copies of the paper, believing that the newspaper's war coverage was accurate.Inquirer journalist Uriah Hunt Painter was at the First Battle of Bull Run in 1861, a battle which ended in a Confederate victory. Initial reports from the government claimed a Union victory, but The Inquirer went with Painter's firsthand account. Crowds threatened to burn The Inquirer's building down because of the report. Another report, this time about General George Meade, angered Meade enough that he punished Edward Crapsey, the reporter who wrote it. Crapsey and other war correspondents later decided to attribute any victories of the Army of the Potomac, Meade's command, to Ulysses S. Grant, commander of the entire Union army. Any defeats of the Army of the Potomac would be attributed to Meade.

During the Civil War, The Inquirer continued to grow with more staff being added and another move into a larger building on Chestnut Street. However, after the war, economic hits combined with Harding becoming ill, hurt The Inquirer. Despite Philadelphia's population growth, distribution fell from 70,000 during the Civil War to 5,000 in 1888. Beginning in 1889, the paper was sold to publisher James Elverson. To bring back the paper, Elverson moved The Inquirer to a new building with the latest printing technology and an increased staff. The "new" Philadelphia Inquirer premiered on March 1 and was successful enough that Elverson started a Sunday edition of the paper. In 1890, in an attempt to increase circulation further, the price of The Inquirer was cut and the paper's size was increased, mostly with classified advertisements. After five years The Inquirer had to move into a larger building on Market Street and later expanded into adjacent property.

20th century
After Elverson's death in 1911, his son by his wife Sallie Duvall, James Elverson Jr. took charge. Under Elverson Jr., the newspaper continued to grow, eventually needing to move again. Elverson Jr. bought land at Broad and Callowhill Streets and built the eighteen-story Elverson Building, now known as the Inquirer Building. The first Inquirer issue printed at the building came out on July 13, 1925. Elverson Jr. died a few years later in 1929 and his sister, Eleanor Elverson, Mrs. Jules Patenôtre, took over.

Eleanor Elverson Patenôtre ordered cuts throughout the paper, but was not really interested in managing it and ownership was soon put up for sale. Cyrus Curtis and Curtis-Martin Newspapers Inc. bought the newspaper on March 5, 1930. Curtis died a year later and his stepson-in-law, John Charles Martin, took charge. Martin merged The Inquirer with another paper, the Public Ledger, but the Great Depression hurt Curtis-Martin Newspapers and the company defaulted in payments of maturity notes. Subsequently, ownership of The Inquirer returned to the Patenôtre family and Elverson Corp. 

Charles A. Taylor was elected president of The Inquirer Co. and ran the paper until it was sold to Moses L. Annenberg in 1936. During the period between Elverson Jr. and Annenberg The Inquirer stagnated, its editors ignoring most of the poor economic news of the Depression. The lack of growth allowed J. David Stern's newspaper, The Philadelphia Record, to surpass The Inquirer in circulation and become the largest newspaper in Pennsylvania.

Under Moses Annenberg, The Inquirer turned around. Annenberg added new features, increased staff and held promotions to increase circulation. By November 1938 Inquirer's weekday circulation increased to 345,422 from 280,093 in 1936. During that same period the Record's circulation had dropped to 204,000 from 328,322. In 1939, Annenberg was charged with income tax evasion. Annenberg pleaded guilty before his trial and was sentenced to three years in prison. While incarcerated he fell ill and died from a brain tumor six weeks after his release from prison in June 1942. Upon Moses Annenberg's death, his son, Walter Annenberg, took over. Not long after, in 1947, the Record went out of business and The Philadelphia Inquirer became Philadelphia's only major daily morning newspaper. While still trailing behind Philadelphia's largest newspaper, the Evening Bulletin, The Inquirer continued to be profitable. In 1948, Walter Annenberg expanded the Inquirer Building with a new structure that housed new printing presses for The Inquirer and, during the 1950s and 1960s, Annenberg's other properties, Seventeen  and TV Guide. In 1957 Annenberg bought the Philadelphia Daily News and combined the Daily News' facilities with The Inquirer's.

A 38-day strike in 1958 hurt The Inquirer and, after the strike ended, so many reporters had accepted buyout offers and left that the newsroom was noticeably empty. Furthermore, many current reporters had been copyclerks just before the strike and had little experience. One of the few star reporters of the 1950s and 1960s was investigative reporter Harry Karafin. During his career Harry Karafin exposed corruption and other exclusive stories for The Inquirer, but also extorted money out of individuals and organizations. Karafin would claim he had harmful information and would demand money in exchange for the information not being made public. This went on from the late 1950s into the early 1960s before Karafin was exposed in 1967 and convicted of extortion a year later. By the end of the 1960s, circulation and advertising revenue was in decline and the newspaper had become, according to Time magazine, "uncreative and undistinguished."

Corporate ownership

In 1969, Annenberg was offered US$55 million for The Inquirer by Samuel Newhouse, but having earlier promised John S. Knight the right of first refusal of any sale offer, Annenberg sold it to Knight instead. The Inquirer, along with the Philadelphia Daily News, became part of Knight Newspapers and its new subsidiary, Philadelphia Newspapers Inc. (PNI). Five years later, Knight Newspapers merged with Ridder Publications to form Knight Ridder.

When The Inquirer was bought, it was understaffed, its equipment was outdated, many of its employees were underskilled and the paper trailed its chief competitor, the Evening Bulletin, in weekday circulation. However, Eugene L. Roberts Jr., who became The Inquirer's executive editor in 1972, turned the newspaper around.  Between 1975 and 1990 The Inquirer won seventeen Pulitzers, six consecutively between 1975 and 1980, and more journalism awards than any other newspaper in the United States. Time magazine chose The Inquirer as one of the ten best daily newspapers in the United States, calling Roberts' changes to the paper, "one of the most remarkable turnarounds, in quality and profitability, in the history of American journalism." By July 1980 The Inquirer had become the most circulated paper in Philadelphia, forcing the Evening Bulletin to shut down two years later. The Inquirer's success was not without hardships. Between 1970 and 1985 the newspaper experienced eleven strikes, the longest lasting forty-six days in 1985. The Inquirer was also criticized for covering "Karachi better than Kensington". This did not stop the paper's growth during the 1980s, and when the Evening Bulletin shut down, The Inquirer hired seventeen Bulletin reporters and doubled its bureaus to attract former Bulletin readers. By 1989, Philadelphia Newspapers Inc.'s editorial staff reached a peak of 721 employees.

The 1990s saw gradually dropping circulation and advertisement revenue for The Inquirer. The decline was part of a nationwide trend, but the effects were exacerbated by, according to dissatisfied Inquirer employees, the paper's resisting changes that many other daily newspapers implemented to keep readers and pressure from Knight Ridder to cut costs. During most of Roberts's time as editor, Knight Ridder allowed him a great deal of freedom in running the newspaper. However, in the late 1980s, Knight Ridder had become concerned about The Inquirer's profitability and took a more active role in its operations. Knight Ridder pressured The Inquirer to expand into the more profitable suburbs, while at the same time cutting staff and coverage of national and international stories. Staff cuts continued until Knight Ridder was bought in 2006, with some of The Inquirer's best reporters accepting buyouts and leaving for other newspapers such as The New York Times and The Washington Post. By the late 1990s, all of the high-level editors who had worked with Eugene Roberts in the 1970s and 1980s had left, none at normal retirement age. Since the 1980s, the paper has won only three Pulitzers: a 1997 award for "Explanatory Journalism.", the public service award (the top category) in 2012 for " its exploration of pervasive violence in the city's schools", and the 2014 prize for criticism, won by architecture critic Inga Saffron. In 1998, Inquirer reporter Ralph Cipriano filed a libel suit against Knight Ridder, The Philadelphia Inquirer, and Inquirer editor Robert Rosenthal over comments Rosenthal made about Cipriano to The Washington Post. Cipriano had claimed that it was difficult reporting negative stories in The Inquirer about the Roman Catholic Archdiocese of Philadelphia and Rosenthal later claimed that Cipriano had "a very strong personal point of view and an agenda ... He could never prove [his stories]." The suit was later settled out of court in 2001.

21st century
The paper launched an online news desk in the early 2000s in order to compete with local radio stations for breaking news. Knight Ridder was bought by rival The McClatchy Company in June 2006. The Inquirer and the Philadelphia Daily News were among the twelve less-profitable Knight Ridder newspapers that McClatchy put up for sale when the deal was announced in March. On June 29, 2006, The Inquirer and Daily News were sold to Philadelphia Media Holdings LLC (PMH), a group of Philadelphian area business people, including Brian P. Tierney, PMH's chief executive. The new owners planned to spend US$5 million on advertisements and promotions to increase The Inquirer's profile and readership.

In the years following Philadelphia Media Holdings' acquisition, The Inquirer saw larger than expected revenue losses, mostly from national advertising, and continued loss of circulation. The revenue losses caused management to cut four hundred jobs at The Inquirer and Daily News in the three years since the papers were bought. Despite efforts to cut costs, Philadelphia Newspapers LLC, filed for Chapter 11 bankruptcy protection on February 21, 2009. Philadelphia Media Holdings was about US$390 million in debt, due to money borrowed to buy The Inquirer and Daily News. The bankruptcy was the beginning of a year-long dispute between Philadelphia Media Holdings and its creditors. The group of creditors, which included banks and hedge funds, wanted to take control of Philadelphia Newspapers LLC themselves and opposed efforts by Philadelphia Media Holdings to keep control. Philadelphia Media Holdings received support from most of the paper's unions and launched a public-relations campaign to promote local ownership. A bankruptcy auction was held on April 28, 2010. The group of lending creditors and a group of local investors allied with Brian Tierney both bid for Philadelphia Newspapers, but the lenders had the winning bid. The deal fell through after the group of lenders, under the name of Philadelphia Media Network (PMN), was unable to reach a contract agreement with the union representing the company's drivers. Philadelphia Newspapers, represented by Lawrence G. McMichael of Dilworth Paxson LLP, challenged the right of creditors to credit bid at a bankruptcy auction.  The U.S. Court of Appeals for the Third Circuit held that credit bidding was not permitted.
The papers went up for auction again in September and again Philadelphia Media Network (PMN) won the bid. After successfully negotiating a contract with all of the paper's fourteen unions, the US$139 million deal became official on October 8.The Philadelphia Inquirer continued to struggle to make a profit, due to competition from digital media sources. By May 2012, the combined journalist staff at all of Philadelphia Media Network was about 320 and some of the same stories and photographs appear both in The Inquirer and Daily News. On April 2, 2012, a group of local business leaders paid $55 million for the paper, less than 15 percent of the $515 million spent to buy the papers in 2006.

In June 2014, PMN was sold to H.F. "Gerry" Lenfest, who appointed C.Z. "Terry" Egger as publisher and CEO in October 2015. In 2016, Lenfest donated PMN to The Philadelphia Foundation, so that The Inquirer, its sister newspaper, the Daily News, and their joint website, Philly.com, could remain in Philadelphia.

Philadelphia Media Network sold the Inquirer Building in October 2011 to developer Bart Blatstein, of Tower Investments Inc., who intends to turn the complex into a mixed-use complex of offices retail and apartments. The next month, publisher and CEO Gregory J. Osberg announced that 600 of the 740 Philadelphia Media Network employees of The Inquirer, Daily News, and Philly.com would move to office space in the former Strawbridge & Clothier department store on east Market Street. The remaining employees would move to offices in the suburbs. The Philadelphia Media Network moved to the new location in July 2012, consolidating the offices entirely on the third floor. The new location would include a street-level lobby and event room. Plans for the building also included electronic signage such as a news ticker on the corner of the high-rise.

In 2019, Philadelphia Media Network was renamed from Philly.com to Inquirer.com and made the Daily News an edition of The Inquirer. Philadelphia Media Network was renamed The Philadelphia Inquirer, LLC. Also, in 2019, The Philadelphia Inquirer was a founding member of Spotlight PA, an investigative reporting partnership focused on Pennsylvania.

On June 2, 2020, The Inquirer ran an Inga Saffron article covering the George Floyd protests under the headline "Buildings Matter, Too", a reference to the "Black Lives Matter" movement. On June 3, the editors apologized for the headline and journalists at The Inquirer wrote an open letter detailing the paper's failures to accurately report on non-white communities. The letter demanded a plan for correcting these issues and stated these journalists would be calling in "sick and tired" on June 4. The letter read in part:

More than 40 Inquirer staffers called in sick on June 4. On June 6, the paper announced that Stan Wischnowski would resign as senior vice president and executive editor. Journalists were told they would not have a say in his replacement. In 2022, the paper admitted to its own racism, both in publishing the article and across the organization.

Politics

John Norvell left the Aurora & Gazette and his job as editor because he disagreed with what he felt was the newspaper's editorial approval of a movement towards a European class system. When Norvell and John Walker founded The Inquirer they wanted the newspaper to represent all people and not just the higher classes. The newly launched newspaper supported Jeffersonian democracy and President Andrew Jackson, and it declared support for the right of the minority's opinion to be heard. A legend about the founding of The Inquirer states that Norvell  said, "There could be no better name than The Inquirer. In a free state, there should always be an inquirer asking on behalf of the people: 'Why was this done? Why is that necessary work not done? Why is that man put forward? Why is that law proposed? Why? Why? Why?'"

When Norvell and Walker sold their newspaper to Jesper Harding, Harding kept the paper close to the founder's politics and backed the Democratic Party. However, disagreeing with Andrew Jackson's handling of the Second Bank of the United States he began supporting the anti-Jackson wing of the Democrats. During the 1836 Presidential election Harding supported the Whig party candidate over the Democratic candidate and afterwards The Inquirer became known for its support of Whig candidates. Before the American Civil War began, The Inquirer supported the preservation of the Union, and was critical of the antislavery movement which many felt was responsible for the Southern succession crisis. Once the war began The Inquirer maintained an independent reporting of the war's events. However The Inquirer firmly supported the Union side. At first The Inquirer's editors were against emancipation of the slaves, but after setbacks by the Union army The Inquirer started advocating a more pro-war and pro-Republican stance. In a July 1862 article, The Inquirer wrote "in this war there can be but two parties, patriots and traitors."

Under James Elverson, The Philadelphia Inquirer declared, "the new Inquirer shall be in all respects a complete, enterprising, progressive newspaper, moved by all the wide-awake spirit of the time and behind in nothing of interest to people who want to know what is going on every day and everywhere...steadily and vigorously Republican in its political policy, but just and fair in its treatment of all questions..." During the 1900 Republican convention in Philadelphia, Elverson set up a large electric banner over Broad Street that declared "Philadelphia Inquirer – Largest Republican Circulation in the World." At the turn of the 20th century the newspaper began editorial campaigns to improve Philadelphia, including the paving of major streets and stopping a corrupt plan to buy the polluted Schuylkill Canal for drinking water. The newspaper continued similar politics under Elverson Jr., and by the 1920s The Inquirer became known as the "Republican Bible of Pennsylvania".

Between 1929 and 1936, while under Patenotre and Curtis-Martin, The Inquirer continued to support the Republican party and President Herbert Hoover, noticeably by not reporting on the news of the Great Depression. Statistics on unemployment or business closings were ignored, even when they came from the government. Information about Philadelphia banks closing was relegated to the back of the financial section. When Moses Annenberg took over The Philadelphia Inquirer, he announced that the paper would "continue to uphold the principles of the Republican Party", but in a meeting with newspaper editors shortly after, he proposed that the paper go independent and support President Franklin D. Roosevelt in the upcoming election. The editors rejected this idea and the paper remained Republican. In the late 1930s, Annenberg disagreed with Roosevelt's New Deal programs and his handling of strikes. This prompted editorials criticizing the policies of Roosevelt and his supporters. He strongly opposed Democratic Pennsylvania governor George Earle and had The Inquirer support the Republican candidates in the 1938 Pennsylvania state elections. When Republicans swept the election there was a celebration at The Inquirer headquarters with red flares and the firing of cannons. The attacks against Democrats and the support given towards Republicans caught the attention of the Roosevelt administration. Annenberg had turned The Philadelphia Inquirer into a major challenger to its chief competitor the Democratic Record, and after Annenberg began focusing on politics, Democratic politicians often attacked Annenberg and accused him of illegal business practices. In 1939, Annenberg was charged with income tax evasion, pleaded guilty before the trial, and was sent to prison for three years. Annenberg's friends and his son, Walter, claimed that the whole trial was politically motivated and his sentence was harsher than it should have been.

Independent

When the Record shut down in 1947, The Inquirer announced that it was now an independent newspaper and, frustrated with corruption in Philadelphia, supported Democratic candidates in the 1951 election. While Walter Annenberg had made The Inquirer independent, he did use the paper to attack people he disliked. Sometimes when a person or group angered Annenberg, that person would be blacklisted and not mentioned anywhere within The Inquirer. People on the blacklist were even airbrushed out of images. People who were on the list at one point included Nicholas Katzenbach, Ralph Nader, Zsa Zsa Gabor, and the basketball team the Philadelphia Warriors, who were not mentioned for an entire season. In 1966, Walter Annenberg used The Inquirer to attack Pennsylvania gubernatorial candidate Milton Shapp. During a press conference, an Inquirer reporter asked Shapp if he had ever been a patient in a mental hospital; having never been a patient, Shapp said no. The next day's headline in The Inquirer read "Shapp Denies Rumors He Had Psychiatric Treatment in 1965." Shapp attributed his loss of the election to Annenberg's attack campaign.

Annenberg was a backer and friend of Richard Nixon. In the 1952 presidential election, critics later claimed Annenberg had The Inquirer look the other way when covering accusations Nixon was misappropriating funds. Later, to avoid accusations of political bias, Annenberg had The Inquirer use only news agency sources such as the Associated Press for the 1960 and 1968 presidential elections. When Nixon was elected president in 1968, Annenberg was appointed the U.S. ambassador to the Court of St. James's. A year later when Annenberg sold the newspaper to Knight Newspapers, a part of the deal stipulated that Annenberg's name would appear as "Editor and Publisher Emeritus" in The Inquirer's masthead. In 1970, Annenberg, already unhappy with changes in the newspaper, had his name removed from the paper after an editorial critical of Richard Nixon appeared.

Under Knight Ridder, The Inquirer continued to be editorially independent. However, conservative commentators have labeled The Inquirer left leaning, and the paper has not endorsed a Republican candidate for President of the United States since Gerald Ford in 1976. Throughout the 1990s and into the 21st century, groups supportive of Israel such as the Zionist Organization of America often accused The Inquirer of being anti-Israel. In 2006, The Inquirer became one of the only major United States newspapers to print one of the Jyllands-Posten Muhammad cartoons. Afterwards, Muslims picketed outside The Inquirer Building to protest the printing of the cartoons in the paper.

When Philadelphia Media Holdings L.L.C. (PMH) bought the paper in 2006, Brian P. Tierney and the business people behind PMH signed a pledge promising that they would not influence the content of the paper. Tierney, a Republican activist who had represented many local groups in the Philadelphia area, had criticized The Inquirer in the past on behalf of his clients. One of Tierney's clients had been the Roman Catholic Archdiocese of Philadelphia, which he had represented during the Cipriano affair. PMH membership also included Bruce E. Toll, vice chairman of Toll Brothers Inc. Tierney said that the group was aware that the fastest way to ruin its investment in The Inquirer was to threaten the paper's editorial independence. The 2012 sale of Philadelphia Media Network to six local business leaders also led to concern of conflict of interest. The new owners, which included New Jersey Democratic fundraiser George Norcross III, media entrepreneur H. F. Lenfest, former New Jersey Nets owner Lewis Katz, and CEO of Liberty Property Trust and chairman of the Greater Philadelphia Chamber of Commerce William Hankowsky, pledged not to influence the content of the paper.

 Board of Directors 
The members of Board of Directors :
 Josh Kopelman
Lisa Kabnick
Stephen J. Harmelin
Elizabeth H. Hughes 
S. Mitra Kalita
Keith Leaphart
Sunny Rao
Brian Tierney
Neil Vogel
Gillian B. White
Richard Worley

Workforce The Inquirer has 225 newsroom employees. 54.7% are male and 45.3% female.

People have complained that the racial demographics of the newsroom do not match the city it covers arguing that the newsroom is 75% white, while 34% of Philadelphia is white. However they apppear to be referencing the demographics inside the city limits while the paper both serves and draws a workforce from the greater Philadelphia area.  The metro Philly area is over 60% white and approximately 20% Black.    So they are accurate that Black journalists are under represented accounting for less than 12% of the newsroom, but overstate the gap by referencing the City of Philadelphia which is 40% Black but ignoring that the greater metro area is approximately 20% Black. Three quarters of editors are white. Six desks– Opinion, Investigations, Upside, Now, Digital and Spotlight– have no Black journalists.

In March 2020, The NewsGuild of Greater Philadelphia and Philadelphia Inquirer LLC reached an agreement on a three-year contract agreement that would include a workforce diversity provision and raises for the entire newsroom, which hadn't seen across the board salary increases since August 2009. NewsGuild membership ratified the three-year contract agreement on March 17, 2020.

ProductionThe Philadelphia Inquirer is headquartered at 100 S. Independence Mall west in the Market East section of Center City Philadelphia along with the Philadelphia Daily News. In 2020 The Inquirer closed its Schuylkill Printing Plant in Upper Merion Township, laying off about 500 employees.  , printing of The Inquirer and the Philadelphia Daily News has been outsourced to a printing plant in Cherry Hill, New Jersey owned by Gannett.

, The Inquirer’s publisher is Elizabeth H. Hughes. Editor and senior vice president is Gabriel Escobar. Managing editors are Charlotte Sutton, Patrick Kerkstra, Richard G. Jones, Michael Huang and Danese Kenon. Deputy Managing Editors are James Neff, Kate Dailey and Brian Leighton.

Since 1995, The Inquirer has been available on the Internet, most recently at Inquirer.com, which, along with the Philadelphia Daily News, is part of The Philadelphia Inquirer LLC. The Inquirer's local coverage area includes Philadelphia, southeastern Pennsylvania, and southern New Jersey. In September 1994 The Inquirer and WPHL-TV co-produced a 10 p.m. newscast called Inquirer News Tonight. The show lasted a year before WPHL-TV took complete control over the program and was renamed WB17 News at Ten. In 2004, The Inquirer'' formed a partnership with Philadelphia's NBC station, WCAU, giving the paper access to WCAU's weather forecasts while also contributing to news segments throughout the day.

Pulitzer Prizes

See also
 The Philadelphia Inquirer people
 List of newspapers in Pennsylvania
 List of newspapers in the United States by circulation
 Media in Philadelphia

References
Notes

External links

 
1829 establishments in Pennsylvania
Daily newspapers published in Pennsylvania
Newspapers published in Philadelphia
Publications established in 1829
Pulitzer Prize for Public Service winners
Pulitzer Prize-winning newspapers